The California Department of Alcoholic Beverage Control (ABC) is a government agency of the state of California that regulates the manufacture, distribution, and sale of alcoholic beverages.

Background
Upon the repeal of prohibition in 1933 and the return of the legal sale of alcoholic beverages to California, taxation and regulation of the manufacture, distribution, and sale of alcoholic beverages were given to the State Board of Equalization. In 1955, an amendment to the State Constitution became effective removing the duty of regulating the manufacture and sale of alcoholic beverages from the State Board of Equalization and placing it in the new Department of Alcoholic Beverage Control.

The department is headed by a director appointed by the Governor of California, and its two divisions are divided into districts based on population and geographical needs.

The Department’s workload is divided into three elements: administration, licensing, and compliance. The Department’s Headquarters in Sacramento consists of the Director’s office and other offices performing licensing, fiscal management, legal, trade practices, training, and personnel/labor relations and other administrative support functions for the Department.

Agents and/or Licensing Representatives investigate applications for licenses to sell alcoholic beverages and report on the moral character and fitness of applicants and the suitability of premises where sales are to be conducted. These reports are reviewed at the District Office and are forwarded to Headquarters in Sacramento for further review and processing. If the license is denied, or if its issuance is protested, the applicant is entitled to a hearing before an Administrative Law Judge. After hearing the evidence, the Administrative Law Judge makes a proposed decision which is reviewed by the Legal Section of the Department and acted upon by the Director.

ABC Agents are peace officers under Section 830.2 of the California Penal Code and are empowered to investigate and make arrests for violations of the Business and Professions Code that occur on or about licensed premises. Agents are further empowered to enforce any penal provisions of the law any place in the State. Licensees who violate State laws or local ordinances are subject to disciplinary action and may have their licenses suspended or revoked. These licensees are entitled to a hearing before an Administrative Law Judge and an appellate process to the State Supreme Court.

AB-1221 
The Alcoholic Beverage Control Act, administered by the Department of Alcoholic Beverage Control, regulates the granting of licenses for the manufacture, distribution, and sale of alcoholic beverages within the state. Under existing law, any on-sale license authorizes the sale of the alcoholic beverage specified in the license for consumption on the premises where sold. Currently, the Licensee Education on Alcohol and Drugs (LEAD) program is a voluntary prevention and education program for retail licensees, their employees, and applicants, regarding alcohol responsibility and the law.

This bill, in addition to the LEAD program, would establish the Responsible Beverage Service (RBS) Training Program Act of 2017, and would require the department, on or before January 1, 2020, to develop, implement, and administer a curriculum for an RBS training program, as specified. The bill would, beginning July 1, 2021, require an alcohol server, as defined, to successfully complete an RBS training course offered or authorized by the department. The bill would authorize the department to charge a fee, not to exceed $15, for any RBS training course provided by the department and require the fee to be deposited in the Alcohol Beverage Control Fund. The bill would provide that an RBS training course include information on, among other things, state laws and regulations relating to alcoholic beverage control and the impact of alcohol on the body. The bill would require the department to authorize one or more accreditation agencies to accredit training providers to offer RBS training courses that meet curriculum requirements established by the department and authorize the department to approve training providers that are not accredited, as provided. The bill would authorize the department to collect fees to cover its reasonable costs for the review, approval, and renewal of approval of accreditation agencies and nonaccredited training providers. The bill would require licensees to maintain, and provide upon request by the department, all records necessary to establish compliance with these provisions. The bill would provide that a violation of these provisions shall not be grounds for any criminal action, pursuant to the Alcoholic Beverage Control Act, against a licensee or an employee of a licensee.

See also
 Black Cat bar (police activity)

References

External links
California Department of Alcoholic Beverage Control
 Department of Alcoholic Beverage Control in the California Code of Regulations

Government agencies established in 1955
State alcohol agencies of the United States
Alcoholic Beverage Control
1955 establishments in California